Celebrity Scissorhands is a reality television show that is part of the BBC's Children in Need charity campaign, in which celebrities attempt to cut people's hair to raise money for the campaign while trained and watched by professional hairdresser Lee Stafford.

Series 1 (2006)
The first series began airing on BBC Three on 5 November 2006; BBC One began airing it in late night on 12 November; and it ran for two weeks, culminating on 17 November, the annual Children in Need night, when it aired as part of the Children in Need telethon on BBC One. It was hosted by Alex Zane. The celebrities were trained by Lee Stafford, a leading hairdresser, at a hair and beauty academy set up at the BBC Television Centre in London which was opened to the public on 4 November. BBC stars and ordinary people had makeovers performed at the academy.

On 17 November, five of the celebrities, chosen by a public telephone and text message vote, appeared live in the salon during the Children in Need show. These were Steve Strange, Scott Mills, Darren Day, Michelle Dewberry and Ortis Deley.

Contestants
Series 1 contestants were:

Series 2 (2007)
The second series was shown on BBC Three from 25 October to 15 November 2007. Lee Stafford returned as manager of the salon and first series winner Steve Strange also returned as assistant manager. George Lamb presented the show. Kelly Condron voiced the series.

Contestants
Series contestants (in alphabetical order):

Series 3 (2008)
The third series began on 26 October 2008, airing on BBC Three in aid of Children in Need.

Lee Stafford returned as manager of the salon, with series 1 winner Steve Strange back as assistant manager and George Lamb again hosting the show.

In early November, it was announced that the 3 people that would be going through to the final, that went on to take place on 14 November on BBC One, were Jeff, Sabrina and Scott.

The winner was Sabrina and the runner-up was Jeff.

Contestants
Contestants (in alphabetical order) are:

 *Jay Sean was confirmed for the series but withdrew before it was aired for unconfirmed reasons

References

External links 
 

BBC – Celebrity Scissorhands
BBC – Celebrity Scissorhands returns for 2007
Celebrity Scissorhands 2007

2006 British television series debuts
2008 British television series endings
2000s British reality television series
BBC high definition shows
BBC reality television shows
English-language television shows
Children in Need
Television series by Banijay